The 1893 Kentucky Derby was the 19th running of the Kentucky Derby. The race took place on May 10, 1893.

Full results

Winning breeder: Scoggan Brothers (KY)

Payout
 The winner received a purse of $3,840.
 Second place received $400.
 Third place received $150.

References

1893
Kentucky Derby
Derby
May 1893 sports events